"Chopsticks" (original name "The Celebrated Chop Waltz") is a simple, widely known waltz for the piano. Written in 1877, it is the only published piece by the British composer Euphemia Allen (under the pen name Arthur de Lulli). Allen—whose brother, Mozart , was a music publisher—was sixteen when she composed the piece, with arrangements for solo and duet. The title "Chop Waltz" comes from Allen's specification that the melody be played in two-part harmony with both hands held in a vertical orientation, little fingers down and palms facing each other, striking the keys with a chopping motion. The similar "The Coteletten Polka" also was first heard in 1877, with the piano collection Paraphrases elaborating on the theme by 1879.

Tati-tati and Paraphrases 

An equivalent of this rudimentary two-finger piano exercise was known in Russia in duple meter as "tati-tati" or the "Cutlet Polka". This version alternates the notes between the hands, rather than playing them at the same time in harmony.

In 1877, Alexander Borodin's daughter Gania played "The Coteletten Polka", with four bars of music similar to the beginning of de Lulli's work, though there is no hard evidence of a common source between the two pieces. In 1878–1879, César Cui, Anatoly Lyadov, Borodin, Nikolai Rimsky-Korsakov, and Nikolai Shcherbachov each wrote variations for piano duet on the theme, published together under the title Paraphrases. A supplementary paraphrase by Franz Liszt was later appended to the collection. In Borodin's version, the first four bars begin in a similar way to de Lulli's, but are nevertheless distinct. According to Fuld's book World-Famous Music, no common origins for the "Chop Waltz" and the "Coteletten Polka" have yet been discovered.

In cinema, music and television 

 "Chopsticks" was used as the introductory music to Edgar Kennedy's series of short comedies made at the RKO Studios, from 1931 until his death in 1948.
 American composer and educator John Sylvanus Thompson published a set of variations on "Chopsticks" in 1941.
 The first three Pooch the Pup cartoons used "Chopsticks" as their opening music.
 In the 1946 William Wyler film The Best Years of Our Lives, composer Hoagy Carmichael performs a duet of "Chopsticks" with Harold Russell, a World War II Navy veteran who lost both of his hands in combat. He played the simple piece (including variations) with Hoagy taking the lower part. Mr. Russell's hooks that served as hands seemingly did not deter him from delivering a rendering of the tune, complete with a final glissando up the keyboard.
 While the 1946 Bugs Bunny short cartoon Rhapsody Rabbit mostly features Liszt's "Hungarian Rhapsody No. 2", at one point a mouse briefly plays the opening bars of "Chopsticks".
 Liberace plays a virtuoso "Chopsticks" accompanied by full orchestra early in the 1955 film Sincerely Yours.
 The theme music for the television series My Three Sons (1960–1972), written by Frank De Vol, was based on "Chopsticks", though key changes were added and the meter was changed to 4/4.
 In the 1955 Billy Wilder film The Seven Year Itch, Tom Ewell played this together with Marilyn Monroe and tried to kiss her, only to fail.
 In the 1955 season 4 episode of I Love Lucy "Ethel's Home Town", "Chopsticks" is played by Fred Mertz (William Frawley).
 In the 1972 Columbo episode "Etude in Black", Columbo plays chopsticks as a way to get under the skin of the pompous murderer/conductor Alex Benedict (John Cassavetes).
 "Chopsticks" accompanied the sequence in the 1972 ABC Saturday Superstar Movie Popeye Meets the Man Who Hated Laughter in which Beetle Bailey's comrade Sergeant Snorkel piled a variety of food on top of a secret message he planned to eat, Dagwood sandwich style.
 A simplified version of the tune is featured in the Manfred Mann's Earth Band version of the song "Blinded by the Light", originally by Bruce Springsteen. The Springsteen version did not contain the tune.
 "Chopsticks" is the second song played by Tom Hanks and Robert Loggia in the famous piano scene at FAO Schwarz in the 1988 film Big.
 In the stage musical adaption of The Lion King, "Chopsticks" can be heard in the song "Lioness' Hunt".
 In the episode "Blind Faith" Season 2 Episode 5 of Quantum Leap first aired November 1, 1989 Scott Bakula leaps into a blind piano player on stage just in time for the encore performance. Bakula plays "Chopsticks" amusing the large audience in the music hall.
 The character Ryan Sinclair plays chopsticks in "The Haunting of Villa Diodati", an episode of Doctor Who anachronistically set in 1816.
 The melody is quoted in Hoyt Curtin's theme to the 1960s Hanna-Barbera animated sitcom The Jetsons.
 In the film Lisztomania (1975), the theme is a recurring joke each time Franz Liszt plays it in public.
 The melody is the basis of J-pop group NiziU's 2021 single "Chopstick".

See also 
 "Heart and Soul", 1938 song by Hoagy Carmichael with lyrics by Frank Loesser with a similarly simple fingering

Notes

References

Further reading
 

1877 compositions
Compositions for solo piano
Compositions in C major